Extraordinary Rendition (stylized eXtraOrdinary rendition) is the debut album of Rupa & the April Fishes, released April 15, 2008 on the Cumbancha label. It includes influences such as Argentinian tango, Gypsy swing, and Indian ragas. The title is a reference to the practise of torture by proxy, or extraordinary rendition.

Track list

Further reading
Allmusic review
BBC review
Exclaim! review

2008 debut albums